Redan is a census-designated place (CDP) in DeKalb County, Georgia, United States. As of the 2020 census, the CDP had a total population of 31,749. It is a predominantly African American community in eastern DeKalb County, and is a suburb of Atlanta.

According to tradition, the name "Redan" is an amalgamation of the names of two early settlers: N. M. Reid and Annie Alford. Redan High School is located in Redan CDP, and Lithonia High School was formerly in the Redan CDP.

Geography
Redan is located at  (33.739256, -84.165781).

Demographics

2020 census

As of the 2020 United States census, there were 31,749 people, 11,471 households, and 7,143 families residing in the CDP.

2000 census
At the 2000 census there were 33,841 people, 11,748 households, and 8,517 families in the CDP. The racial makeup of the CDP was 5.68% White, 91.27% African American, 0.12% Native American, 0.70% Asian, 0.03% Pacific Islander, 0.75% from other races, and 1.44% from two or more races. Hispanic or Latino of any race were 1.78%.

Of the 11,748 households 44.6% had children under the age of 18 living with them, 42.4% were married couples living together, 24.9% had a female householder with no husband present, and 27.5% were non-families. 21.4% of households were one person and 1.3% were one person aged 65 or older.  The average household size was 2.88 and the average family size was 3.35.

The age distribution was 31.8% under the age of 18, 8.9% from 18 to 24, 38.1% from 25 to 44, 18.1% from 45 to 64, and 3.1% 65 or older.  The median age was 30 years. For every 100 females, there were 85.5 males.  For every 100 females age 18 and over, there were 77.2 males.

The median household income was $51,564 and the median family income  was $56,021. Males had a median income of $36,115 versus $31,166 for females. The per capita income for the CDP was $20,316. 5.5% of the population and 4.1% of families were below the poverty line. Out of the total population, 6.2% of those under the age of 18 and 7.4% of those 65 and older were living below the poverty line.

Education
DeKalb County School District serves the CDP.

Elementary schools serving parts of Redan CDP:
 Redan Elementary School (Redan CDP)
 Panola Way Elementary School (Stonecrest, formerly Redan CDP as of 2010)
 Woodridge Elementary School
 E. L. Miller Elementary School
 Shadow Rock Elementary School
Some areas formerly in the CDP are zoned to Stoneview Elementary School, in Stonecrest.

Middle schools serving parts of Redan CDP:
 Redan Middle School (Redan CDP)
 Lithonia Middle School (Lithonia)
 Miller Grove Middle School

Redan High School is in Redan CDP. Lithonia High School, formerly in the CDP, is now in Stonecrest. They, along with Miller Grove High School in Stonecrest, serve portions of the CDP.

There are the following DeKalb County Public Library branches:
 Redan-Trotti
 Hairston Crossing

References

External links
Redan, Georgia, Hometown, USA website

Census-designated places in DeKalb County, Georgia
Census-designated places in Georgia (U.S. state)
Census-designated places in the Atlanta metropolitan area